A general election was held in the U.S. state of South Dakota on November 6, 2018. All of South Dakota's executive officers were up for election as well as South Dakota's at-large seat in the United States House of Representatives.

United States House of Representatives

Incumbent Republican U.S. Representative Kristi Noem did not run for re-election and instead ran for governor.

Governor and Lieutenant Governor

Incumbent Republican Governor Dennis Daugaard was term-limited and could not seek re-election to a third consecutive term.

Attorney General

Incumbent Republican Attorney General Marty Jackley was term-limited and could not run for re-election to a third term. Jackley ran for governor.

Republican primary
Lawrence County State's Attorney John Fitzgerald, Chief Deputy Attorney General Charlie McGuigan, and attorney and 2014 U.S. Senate candidate Jason Ravnsborg ran for the Republican nomination.

Democratic primary
Former U.S. Attorney for the District of South Dakota, Randy Seiler won the nomination at the South Dakota Democratic Convention.

Secretary of State
Incumbent Republican Secretary of State Shantel Krebs did not run for re-election and instead ran for Congress. Governing magazine projected the race as "safe Republican".

Republican primary
State Auditor Steve Barnett ran for the Republican nomination.

State Treasurer
Incumbent Republican State Treasurer Rich Sattgast was term-limited and could not run for re-election to a third term.

Republican primary
Josh Haeder, Northeast Director for Senator Mike Rounds, ran for the Republican nomination.

State Auditor
Incumbent Republican State Auditor Steve Barnett was term-limited and could not run for re-election to a third term.

Commissioner of School and Public Lands

Public Utilities Commission

References

External links
Candidates at Vote Smart 
Candidates at Ballotpedia
Campaign finance at OpenSecrets

Official Attorney General campaign websites
Jason Ravnsborg (R) for Attorney General
Randy Seiler (D) for Attorney General

Official Secretary of State campaign websites
Steve Barnett (R) for Secretary of State
Alexandra Frederick (D) for Secretary of State

Official State Treasurer campaign websites
Josh Haeder (R) for Treasurer
Aaron Matson (D) for Treasurer

Official Commissioner of School and Public Lands campaign websites
Ryan Brunner (R) for Commissioner

Official Public Utilities Commissioner campaign websites
Kristie Fiegen (R) for Public Utilities Commissioner